Räisänen is an eastern Finnish surname. Notable people with the surname include:

 Yrjö Räisänen (1888–1948), Finnish politician
 Tapio Räisänen (born 1949), Finnish ski jumper
 Antti Räisänen (born 1950), Finnish scientist
 Tomi Räisänen (born 1976), Finnish composer
 Timo Räisänen (born 1979), Swedish musician
 Meeri Räisänen (born 1989), Finnish ice hockey goaltender
 Otso Räisänen (born 1994), Finnish freestyle skier

Finnish-language surnames